Shafiu "Shaafee" Ahmed (born 16 March 1987) is a Maldivian footballer, who is currently playing for New Radiant SC. Shaafee is also a player of Maldives national football team. He is from the island of Eydhafushi, Baa Atoll.

References

External links 
Player profile at soccer.com.mv
2011 SAFF Championship Squad at maldivesoccer.net

1987 births
Living people
Maldivian footballers
Maldives international footballers
Club Valencia players
Victory Sports Club players
New Radiant S.C. players
United Victory players
Association football defenders
Association football midfielders
Footballers at the 2010 Asian Games
Footballers at the 2014 Asian Games
Asian Games competitors for the Maldives